Hovea trisperma, commonly known as common hovea, it is a flowering plant in the family Fabaceae. It is a small straggling shrub with purple-blue flowers and is endemic to Western Australia.

Description 
The branches thickly or sparsely coved with flattened hairs, often crinkled or twisted. The inflorescences are borne in leaf axils in a cluster of 1-6 purplish-blue flowers, either sessile or on a short peduncle. Flowering occurs from May to November and the fruit is an oval-shaped pod.

Taxonomy and naming
Hovea trisperma was first formally described in 1837 by George Bentham and the description was published in Enumeratio plantarum quas in Novae Hollandiae ora austro-occidentali ad fluvium Cygnorum et in Sinu Regis Georgii collegit Carolus liber baro de Hügel. The specific epithet (trisperma) means "three seed" referring to the fruit.

Distribuiton and habitat
Common hovea grows in sandy and clay soils in heath, woodlands and mallee from Perth, south to Busselton, and to the south-west near Albany, and Esperance.

References

External links

 Pictures of Hovea trisperma

trisperma
Near threatened flora of Australia
Rosids of Western Australia